India's Red List of 2018 was released at the Rio+20 Earth Summit. It contained 132 species of plants and animals considered endangered in India.

Critically endangered animals

Arthropods
 Rameshwaram parachute spider (Poecilotheria hanumavilasumica)
 Peacock tarantula (Poecilotheria metallia)

Insects
 Pygmy hog-suckin' louse (Haematopinus oliveri)

Birds
 White-bellied heron (Ardea insignis)
 Great Indian bustard (Ardeotis niriceps)
 Baer's pochard (Aythya baeri)
 Spoon-billed sandpiper (Calidris pygmaea)
 White-rumped vulture (Gyps bengalensis)
 Indian vulture (Gyps indicus)
 Slender-billed vulture (Gyps tenuirostris)
 Bengal florican (Houbaropsis bengalensis)
 Bugun liocichla (Liocichla bugunorum)
 Himalayan quail (Ophrysia superciliosa)
 Jerdon's courser (Rhinoptilus bitorquatus)
 Red-headed vulture (Sarcogyps calvus)
 Sociable lapwing (Vanellus gregarius)
 Christmas Island frigatebird (Fregata andrewsi)
 Pink-headed duck (Rhodonessa caryophyllacea)
 Yellow-breasted bunting (Emberiza aureola)
 Siberian crane (Grus leucogeranus)
 Forest owlet (Athene blewitti)

Fish
 Wayanad mahseer (Barbodes wynaadensis)
 Pondicherry shark (Carcharhinus hemiodon)
 Ganges shark (Glyphis gangeticus)
 Glyptothorax kashmirensis
 Kudremukh glyptothorax (Glyptothorax kudremukhensis)
 Nilgiri mystus (Hemibagrus punctatus ) 
 Horalabiosa arunachalami
 Hypselobarbus pulchellus
 Red Canarese barb (Hypselobarbus thomassi)
 Mesonoemacheilus herrei
 Bovany barb (Neolissochilus bovanicus)
 Deolali minnow (Parapsilorhynchus prateri) possibly extinct
 Pookode Lake barb (Pethia pookodensis)
 Common sawfish (Pristis pristis)
 Largetooth sawfish (Pristis microdon)
 Longcomb sawfish (Pristis zijsron)
 Psilorhynchus tenura
 Deccan barb (Puntius deccanensis)
 Schistura papulifera

Reptiles and amphibians
 Madras spotted skink (Barkudia insularis)
 Northern river terrapin (Batagur baska)
 Red-crowned roofed turtle (Batagur kachuga)
 Cnemaspis anaikattiensis
 Hawksbill sea turtle (Eretmochelys imbricata)
 Gharial (Gavialis gangeticus)
 Ghats wart frog (Fejervarya murthii)
 Jeypore ground gecko (Geckoella jeyporensis)
 Gundia Indian frog (Indirana gundia)
 Toad-skinned frog (Indirana phrynoderma)
 Rao's torrt frog (Micrixalus kottigeharensis)
 Charles Darwin's frog (Minervarya charlesdarwini)
 Dattatreya night frog (Nyctibatrachus dattatreyaensis)
 Sacred grove bushfrog (Philautus sanctisilvaticus)
 Amboli bush frog (Pseudophilautus amboli)
 White-spotted bush frog (Raorchestes chalazodes)
 Green eyed bushfrog (Raorchestes chlorosomma)
 Griet bush frog (Raorchestes griet)
 Kaikatti bushfrog (Raorchestes kaikatti)
 Mark's bushfrog (Raorchestes marki)
 Munnar bush frog (Raorchestes munnarensis)
 Ponmudi bush frog (Raorchestes ponmudi)
 Resplendent shrubfrog (Raorchestes resplendens)
 Shillong bubble-nest frog (Raorchestes shillongensis)
 Anaimalai flying frog (Rhacophorus pseudomalabaricus)
 Sushil's bushfrog (Raorchestes sushili)
 Amboli toad (Xanthophryne tigerina)
 Ghats wart frog (Zakerana murthii)

Mammals
 Namdapha flying squirrel (Biswamoyopterus biswasi)
 Elvira rat (Cremnomys elvira)
 Andaman shrew (Crocidura andamanensis)
 Jenkins' shrew (Crocidura jenkinsi)
 Nicobar shrew (Crocidura nicobarica)
 Chinese pangolin (Manis pentadactyla)
 Malabar large-spotted civet (Viverra civettina)
 Kashmir stag or hangul (Cervus canadensis hanglu)

Endangered animals

Fish
 Knifetooth sawfish (Anoxypristis cuspidata)
 Asian arowana (Scleropages formosus) 
 Red line torpedo barb (Sahyadria denisonii)
 Golden mahaseer (Tor putitora)
 Deccan labeo (Labeo potail)

Birds
 Steppe eagle (Aquila nipalensis)
 Great knot (Calidris tenuirostris) 
 Masked finfoot (Heliopais personatus)
 Lesser florican (Sypheotides indicus)
 Manipur bush-quail (Perdicula manipurensis)
 Greater adjutant (Leptoptilos dubius) 
 White-bellied blue robin (Myiomela albiventris) 
 Nilgiri blue robin (Myiomela major) 
 White-winged duck (Asarcornis scutulata) 
 White-headed duck (Oxyura leucocephala) 
 Green peafowl (Pavo muticus)
 Narcondam hornbill (Rhyticero)
 Nordmann's greenshank (Tringa guttifer) 
 Black-bellied tern (Sterna acuticauda) 
 Black-chinned laughingthrush (Trochalopteron jerdoni)
 Egyptian vulture (Neophron percnopterus)

Reptiles
 Perrotet's vine snake (Ahaetulla perroteti) 
 Three-striped roofed turtle (Batagur dhongoka) 
 Green turtle (Chelonia mydas) 
 Indian narrow-headed softshell turtle (Chitra indica
 Goan day gecko (Cnemaspis goaensis) 
 Wyanad day gecko (Cnemaspis wynadensis) 
 Keeled box turtle (Cuora mouhotii) 
 Boulenger's dasia (Dasia subcaerulea) 
 Poona skink (Eurylepis poonaensis) 
 Inger's mabuya (Eutropis clivicola) 
 Yellow-headed tortoise (Indotestudo elongata) 
 Asian forest tortoise (Manouria emys) 
 Indian kangaroo lizard (Otocryptis beddomii)
 Assam roofed turtle (Pangshura sylhetensis)
 Cantor's giant softshell turtle (Pelochelys cantorii) 
 Travancore Hills thorntail snake (Platyplectrurus madurensis) 
 Travancore earth snake (Rhinophis travancoricus) 
 Cochin forest cane turtle (Vijayachelys silvatica)

Mammals
 Red panda (Ailurus fulgens)
 Sei whale (Balaenoptera borealis)
 Blue whale (Balaenoptera musculus)
 Fin whale (Balaenoptera physalus)
 Wild water buffalo (Bubalus arnee)
 Hispid hare (Caprolagus hispidus)
 Dhole (Cuon alpinus)
 Indian elephant (Elephas maximus indicus)
 Kolar leaf-nosed bat (Hipposideros hypophyllus)
 Lion-tailed macaque (Macaca silenus)
 White-bellied musk deer (Moschus leucogaster)
 Servant mouse (Mus famulus)
 Mandelli's mouse-eared bat (Myotis sicarius)
 Nilgiri tahr (Nilgiritragus hylocrius)
 Asiatic lion (Panthera leo persica)
 Bengal tiger (Panthera tigris tigris)
 Ganges river dolphin (Platanista gangetica gangetica)
 Gee's golden langur (Trachypithecus geei)
 Nicobar treeshrew (Tupaia nicobarica)
 Sangai (Rucervus eldii eldii)

Vulnerable animals 
Listed by the IUCN :

Mammals
 Brown bear (Ursus arctos)
 Gaur (Bos gaurus)
 Four-horned antelope or chousingha (Tetracerus quadricornis)
 Oriental small-clawed otter (Aonyx cinerea)
 White-chested bear (Ursus thibetanus)
 Yak (Bos grunhniens)
 Takin (Budorcas taxicolor)
 Barasingha (Rucervus duvaucelii)
 Clouded leopard (Neofelis nebulosa)
 Dugong (Dugong dugon)
 Sun bear (Helarctos malayanus)
 Stump-tailed macaque (Macaca arctoides)
 Marbled cat (Pardofelis marmorata)
 Sperm whale (Physeter macrocephalus)
 Rusty-spotted cat (Prionailurus rubiginosus)
 Indian rhinoceros (Rhinoceros unicornis)
 Snow leopard (Uncia uncia)
 Nilgiri marten (Martes gwatkinsii)
 Sloth bear (Melursus ursinus)

Birds
 Sarus crane (Antigone antigone)
 Nicobar megapode (Megapodius nicobariensis)
 Dalmatian pelican (Pelecanus crispus)

Reptiles and amphibians
 Olive ridley sea turtle (Lepidochelys olivacea)

See also
List of extinct animals of India
List of endemic and threatened plants of India
Fauna of India
List of mammals of India
List of birds of India
List of reptiles of India
List of amphibians of India
Endangered mammals of India
Vulnerable species
Endangered species
Critically endangered species
Lists of extinct species

References

Lists of fauna of India
India
.Endangered species
.
Wildlife conservation in India
Lists of endangered animals